The Capilano Suspension Bridge is a simple suspension bridge crossing the Capilano River in the District of North Vancouver, British Columbia, Canada. It is part of a private facility with an admission fee and draws over 1.2 million visitors per year.

History 
The bridge was originally built in 1889 by George Grant Mackay, a Scottish civil engineer and park commissioner for Vancouver. It was originally made of hemp ropes with a deck of cedar planks and was replaced with a wire cable bridge in 1903. In 1910 Edward Mahon purchased the Capilano Suspension Bridge. "Mac" MacEachran purchased the Bridge from Mahon in 1935 and invited local natives to place their totem poles in the park, adding a native theme. In 1945, he sold the bridge to Henri Aubeneau.

The bridge was completely rebuilt in 1956.

The park was sold to Nancy Stibbard, the current owner, in 1983.

In June 2011, a new attraction called Cliffwalk was added to the park.

Incidents 
In September 1999, a woman dropped her 18-month-old child with Down syndrome off the bridge. She claimed she stumbled accidentally and the child slipped from her grasp. The child was not seriously injured. The woman lost legal custody of her child to the child's father as a result of the incident. The woman took legal action against the owner of the bridge, her ex-husband, and the Federal Department of Justice. The case against the owner of the bridge was settled in 2004.

In 2006, a 300-year-old, 46-tonne Douglas fir tree toppled during a heavy snowstorm, falling across the western end of the bridge. Park officials closed the bridge temporarily while repairs were performed.

By the time rescue workers came to his aid, the victim was dead. The official RCMP finding was that the teen was under the influence of LSD at the time of the incident.

On June 2, 2012, a 30-year-old tourist from Ontario died after falling near the bridge. Police say the victim was hiking through trails near the popular attraction when he climbed over a railing and fell to the riverbed below.

Popular culture 
The bridge has been featured as a setting in episodes of several television series, including MacGyver, Sliders, The Crow: Stairway to Heaven, and Psych.

In 1974, social psychologists Donald Dutton and Arthur Aron conducted a well-known experiment on the bridge. Men approached by a female researcher on the bridge were more likely to call her later than men approached on a more solid bridge across the river. Dutton and Aron argued that this supported the theory that the men were mis-attributing the arousal caused by fear of sexual attraction toward the woman. This research supported Stanley Schachter's two-factor theory of emotion.

In June 2019, Korean Pop group NCT 127 created a video of their visit to the Capilano Suspension Bridge as part of the social media documenting their world tour NCT 127: The Origin.

The bridge appears as one of many locations visited in the Vancouver Velocity race course in the mobile game Mario Kart Tour.

See also 
Capilano River
Capilano River Regional Park
Lynn Canyon Suspension Bridge
List of notable pedestrian bridges
List of bridges in Canada

References 

North Shore News September 27, 1999
Gut Rumbles August 26, 2004
Woman who dropped baby on bridge ends lawsuit - By: N.A.. Record, The (Kitchener/Cambridge/Waterloo, ON), 11/03/2004; (AN Q4K036229702804)

External links 

Official Capilano Suspension Bridge and Park website
 
 

Bridges completed in 1889
Bridges completed in 1903
Bridges in Greater Vancouver
North Vancouver (district municipality)
Pedestrian bridges in Canada
Simple suspension bridges
Suspension bridges in Canada
Toll bridges in Canada
Tourism in British Columbia